Commiskey is an unincorporated community in central Montgomery Township, Jennings County, Indiana, United States.  It lies along local roads just west of State Road 3, south of the town of Vernon, the county seat of Jennings County.  Its elevation is 696 feet (212 m), and it is located at  (38.8595005, -85.6455220).  Although Commiskey is unincorporated, it has a post office, with the ZIP code of 47227.

Its biggest business is Stream Cliff Farm.

History
Commiskey was platted in 1870. A post office was opened in Commiskey in 1870, and remains in operation.

References

Unincorporated communities in Jennings County, Indiana
Unincorporated communities in Indiana